Showtime Live Taitung is a shopping mall in Taitung City, Taitung County, Taiwan that opened on July 12, 2013. The main core stores of the mall include Showtime Cinemas, Uniqlo, and various themed restaurants.

History
 On December 1, 2011, Showtime Live Taitung held a groundbreaking ceremony, and it was planned and constructed at a cost of NT$ 500 million.
 On July 12, 2013, Showtime Live Taitung opened.

See also
 List of tourist attractions in Taiwan
 Showtime Live Taichung Wenxin
 Showtime Live Taichung Station
 Showtime Live Shulin
 Showtime Live Chiayi

References

External links

2013 establishments in Taiwan
Shopping malls in Taiwan
Shopping malls established in 2013
Buildings and structures in Taitung County